Delfín Fernández Martínez (born January 15, 1948, in Barcelona) is the founding member of the Spanish rock band Los Salvajes.
 
They were born and grow up in a neighborhood called Poble Sec, a place where he met Gaby Alegret, and Francesc Miralles, with whom he founded, in 1962 Los Salvajes, who are known as the "Spanish Rolling Stones".

Currently he leads his own band called "Delfín Fernández Band".

His self-taught training (learned beating chairs), made Delfín become one of the most powerful and emotive drummers in the Spanish rock scene.

Influenced by the great drummers of '60s Ringo Starr, or Keith Moon, Delfín confesses his predilection and admiration for Charlie Watts.
His favourite drums are: Premier, and Gretch.

Discography 

1964 Hoy comienza mi vida - Nada ha cambiado - Boys - Con el corazón
1965 Siluetas - Goodbye my love - Hielo en vez de amor - No me digas adiós
1965 Se llama Maria - Satisfacion - Wolly Bully - Ya te tengo 
1966 Al Capone - Pienso en ti - Paff bum- A la buena de Dios
1966 La neurastemia - Soy asi - Corre, corre - These Boots are made for walking
1966 Todo negro - Una chica igual que tu -1966 - Es la edad - Que alguien me ayude
1967 Las ovejitas - Rosa de papel - Es mejor dejarlo como esta - No me puedo controlar
1967 Mi bigote - Fuera de mi corazón - Vivir sin ti - El bote que remo
1967 Massachusetts - El Don Juan
1967 LP  "Lo Mejor de Los Salvajes"
1968 Judy con disfraz - Palabras
1968 Vuelve baby - Algo de titere 
1968 Los platillos volantes - Un mensaje te quiero mandar
1969 Nana - I need your loving

External links 
Delfín Fernández in the Internet
 www.delfinfernandezband.com 
 Interview -Spanish-
 Interview -Spanish-
 Interview -Spanish-
 Interview -Spanish-

Los Salvajes

 (tribute site to Los Salvajes. -Spanish-)
 (tribute site to Los Salvajes. -Spanish)
  (tribute site toLos Salvajes. -Spanish)
 (tribute site to Los Salvajes. -Spanish)

Spanish drummers
Living people
Musicians from Barcelona
1948 births